Dr Greg Young, MPIA, MICOMOS is an Australian specialist on culture, planning, and governance, whose cultural and planning models and theories are internationally influential. He was born in Hobart, Tasmania and gained a BA (Hons) from the University of Tasmania, an MA from the University of Sydney, and a PhD from the University of New South Wales; he also holds a Diploma of Urban Studies from Macquarie University, Sydney. He has held academic appointments at Australian universities, senior consulting roles in the private sector, and executive appointments with Australian governments as an interdisciplinary strategist, planner, historian, and advocate. He is currently adjunct professor at the Business School, University of Technology Sydney (UTS), Australia.

Perspective and concepts 

Greg Young coined the term culturisation and developed a concept and model for culturised planning—first outlined in ‘The Culturization of Planning’ Planning Theory 2008 and then with illustrated global case studies in Reshaping Planning with Culture 2008. Culturised governance is outlined in his chapters in The Ashgate Research Companion to Planning and Culture, for which he was principal editor. At its most fundamental, culturisation refers to the positive integration of culture in planning, broader governance, and social uptake. The concept is encompassed by an overarching cultural paradigm for governance and planning that is outlined in the same publication.

From the 1980s onwards Greg Young contributed to a number of pioneering strategies in Australia on culture, including the NSW government's system of heritage studies, the NSW Cultural Tourism Strategy (1991), Australia's first national cultural policy Creative Nation and the Australian Government's model for cultural mapping published as Mapping Culture – A Guide for Cultural and Economic Development in Communities. His culturised model for planning is used in planning teaching, research, and governance internationally; it is based on a comprehensive concept of culture and holistic research using critical, creative, ethical, and reflective standards, techniques, and approaches.

Selected publications 

Young, G. and Stevenson, D. eds. 2016. The Routledge Research Companion to Planning and Culture. Abingdon, Oxford: Routledge.
Young, G. 2016. Reshaping Planning with Culture. Abingdon, Oxford: Routledge.
Young, G. 2008. ‘The Culturisation of Planning’, Planning Theory, 7(1), 71–91.
Young, G., Clark, I. and Sutherland, J. 1995. Mapping Culture – A Guide for Cultural and Economic Development in Communities. Canberra: AGPS.
Young, G. 1984. Conservation, History and Development. Sydney: NSW GIS.
Young, G. 1984. Environmental Conservation – Towards a Philosophy. Sydney: NSW Heritage Council.

References

External links 
 ''Reshaping Planning with Culture'
 The Routledge Research Companion to Planning and Culture
 http://journals.sagepub.com/doi/abs/10.1177/1473095207082035

Australian urban planners
Living people
Year of birth missing (living people)